Typhoon Koppu, known in the Philippines as Typhoon Nando was a typhoon which struck China in September 2009.

Meteorological history 

On September 9, an area of convectional cloudiness associated with the monsoon trough formed  to the northwest of Palau. Satellite imagery showed that a consolidating Low Level Circulation Centre (LLCC) with convection had started to develop and was wrapping toward the center. On September 11, the LLCC started to show improvement and was under moderate vertical shear with good westward outflow, but the JMA still upgraded the system to a minor tropical depression. Early of September 12, PAGASA upgraded the system in their responsibility and assigned its local name, Nando. At 1500 UTC, PAGASA reported that the depression made its landfall over northern Palanan, Isabela of the Philippines. However both JMA and JTWC reported that the depression did not make landfall but only crossed the Luzon strait. Early of the next day, JTWC upgraded the system into a tropical depression. Early of September 13, both JMA and JTWC upgraded the system as a tropical storm and assigned its international name, Koppu. Koppu is a Japanese name, and it means Crater (コップ座) . In the afternoon, JMA reported that Koppu intensified into a severe tropical storm. On the 14th, the JMA reported that Koppu had intensified to a minimal typhoon, but the JTWC still kept Koppu as a tropical storm for the next few hours but later acknowledging the intensification and upgraded Koppu to a minimal typhoon. But the JTWC issued their final advisory early on September 15, as Koppu was moving over land, and was expected to dissipate quickly.

Impact 

In Luzon, a 48-hour rainfall was experienced. In Visayas and Mindanao, a 24-hour rainfall was also experienced due to Nando's enhancing southwest monsoon. About 10 provinces were raised in signal warning no.1 from September 12 – September 13. Nando had triggered landslides resulting road closures and evacuations of some residents in Kalinga province. The storm then caused major flood in Luoding, People's Republic of China.

References

External links 

 

2009 Pacific typhoon season
Typhoons in China
2009 in China